Andørja Church is a parish church of the Church of Norway in Ibestad Municipality in Troms og Finnmark county, Norway. It is located in the village of Engenes on the northwestern tip of the island of Andørja. It is the church for the Andørja parish which is part of the Trondenes prosti (deanery) in the Diocese of Nord-Hålogaland. The white, wooden church was built in a long church style in 1914 using plans drawn up by the architect S. Kristensen. The church seats about 325 people. The church was consecrated on 11 October 1914 by the Bishop Gustav Dietrichson.

See also
List of churches in Nord-Hålogaland

References

Ibestad
Churches in Troms
Wooden churches in Norway
20th-century Church of Norway church buildings
Churches completed in 1914
1914 establishments in Norway
Long churches in Norway